Safra National Bank of New York (SNBNY) is a nationally chartered U.S. Bank supervised by the Office of the Comptroller of the Currency and member of the Federal Reserve and the Federal Deposit Insurance Corporation (“FDIC”). The Bank serves high-net-worth individuals, businesses, family offices and sophisticated investors in the U.S. and internationally.

Safra National Bank of New York is part of the J. Safra Group, which consists of privately-owned banks under the Safra name such as Banco Safra S.A.  and Bank J. Safra Sarasin, all independent from one another with more than 170 locations worldwide. The Group’s also known for its investment holdings in asset based business sectors such as real estate owning more than 200 premier commercial, retail and farmland buildings properties worldwide such as New York City’s 660 Madison Avenue office complex and London’s iconic Gherkin Building and agribusiness, such as the Chiquita Bananas.

Locations 
Safra National National Bank is headquartered in New York City, with branches in Aventura and Palm Beach in Florida and has representative offices in Brazil, Chile, Mexico and Panama. Through its affiliates it also service client in various markets including: Argentina and Uruguay.

Products & Services 
Safra National Bank of New York offer a broad portfolio of Private Banking and Financial Products and Services for sophisticated clients and institutions such as Deposit and Checking Accounts, Credit Card, Extensive Credit and loan products, Commercial Real Estate, Wire Transfers, Foreign Currency Accounts and Payments, Custody and Safekeeping of Investments.

Slogan 
The company's slogan is: "If you choose to sail upon the seas of banking, build your bank as you would your boat, with the strength to sail safely through any storm." (Jacob Safra)

See also
Bank Jacob Safra Switzerland

References

Companies based in New York City
Banks based in New York City
Banks established in 1982
Safra family
1982 establishments in New York (state)